The Union Label and Service Trades Department, AFL–CIO was founded on April 12, 1909, to promote the products and services produced in America by trade union members—especially those products and services identified by a union label, shop card, store card and/or service button. The department is a constitutionally mandated department of the AFL–CIO.

The department's offices are located at the AFL–CIO headquarters in Washington, D.C. The department has many state and local councils and committees, and works closely with AFL–CIO state and local labor bodies to carry out its functions.

Activities
The ULS&TD primary function is to promote the union label. These emblems demonstrate that the employees who make the product or provide the service are union workers, and that they are treated fairly by their employers.

The ULS&TD also coordinates national boycotts that have been endorsed by the AFL–CIO executive council. The department maintains and publishes the "Do Not Buy" list of companies being boycotted and the products and services involved. The Label Letter publication is the most visible means the department uses to publicize boycott updates. The Label Letter features special interest stories, alerts, a "Do Buy" section, and other information of interest. Member unions of the AFL–CIO and their local affiliates often reproduce sections and articles of the newsletter to spreading the "union label message" to union members and their families.

One of the more widely known activities of the department is the annual AFL–CIO Union-Industries Show. Held in a different city each year, the show is a cooperative effort of unions and the companies with which they have contracts. Unions and employers exhibit union-made and American-made products and services. Free to the public, the event often draws large crowds.

ULS&TD also exclusively endorses the "Shop Union Made" website as an "official" Internet shopping site for union-made products and services.

Presidents
1909: John Brown Lennon
1911: John F. Tobin
John W. Hays
1926: George William Perkins
1934: Matthew Woll
1956: John J. Mara
1960: Richard F. Walsh
1975: Joseph D. Keenan
John E. Mara
1980s: James E. Hatfield
1990s: Charles Mercer
2008: Richard Kline

References
 Foner, Philip S. History of the Labor Movement in the United States. Vol. 3: The Policies and Practices of the American Federation of Labor, 1900–1909. New York: International Publishers, 1964. 
 Maurice F. Neufeld "Structure and Government of the AFL–CIO." Industrial and Labor Relations Review. 9:3 (April 1956).

External links
 Union Label Dept. website
 Union Label and Service Trades Department, Secretary-Treasurer's records at the University of Maryland libraries

AFL–CIO
Trade unions in the United States
1909 establishments in the United States
Trade unions established in 1909